This is an inclusive list of science fiction television programs whose names begin with the letter M.

M
Live-action:
M.A.N.T.I.S. (1994–1995)
Maddigan's Quest (2006, New Zealand)
Man and the Challenge, The (1959–1960)
Man in the High Castle, The (2015–2019)
Man from Atlantis (1977–1978)
Man from U.N.C.L.E., The (1964–1968) (elements of science fiction)
Man Who Fell to Earth, The (1987, pilot)
Mandalorian, The (2019–present)
Mandog (1972, UK) IMDb
Mandrake the Magician (1954, pilot)
Manimal (1983)
Mann & Machine (1992)
Mars (2016–2018)
Martian Chronicles, The (1980, miniseries)
Marvin Marvin (2012–2013)
Masters of Science Fiction (2007, anthology)
Matthew Blackheart: Monster Smasher (2002, film) IMDb
Max Headroom (franchise):
Max Headroom: 20 Minutes into the Future (1985, UK, film)
Max Headroom (1987–1988)
Mech-X4 (2016–2018)
Meego (1997)
Memories of the Alhambra (2018-2019, South Korea)
Men into Space (1959–1960)
Mentors (1998–2002) IMDb
Mercy Point (1998–1999)
Metal Hero (Japan)
Métal Hurlant Chronicles (2012–2014, France/Belgium, anthology)
Metal Mickey (1980–1983, UK)
Middleman, The (2008)
Mighty Boosh, The (2004–2007, UK) (elements of science fiction in some episodes)
Mighty Jack (1968, Japan)
Mighty Med (2013–2015)
Mike and Angelo (1989–2000, UK)
Mind Beyond, The (1975)
Minority Report (2015)
Miracles (2003)
Miraculous Mellops, The (1991)
Mirai Sentai Timeranger (2000–2001, Japan)*Mirror, Mirror (franchise):
Mirror, Mirror (1995, Australia/New Zealand)
Mirror, Mirror II (1997–1998, Australia/New Zealand, Mirror, Mirror sequel)
Misfits (2009–2013, UK)
Misfits of Science (1985–1986)
Mission Genesis (US) a.k.a. Deepwater Black (UK/Canada) (1997)
Missions (2017–present, France)
Mission Terra (1985-1988, Germany)
Mister Terrific (1967)
Monsters (1988)
Moonbase 3 (1973, UK)
Moonhaven (2022)Moonlight Mask (franchise):
Mork & Mindy (1978–1982)Mortal Kombat (franchise):
Mortal Kombat: Konquest a.k.a. Mortal Kombat: Conquest (1998–1999)
Mr. Squiggle (1959–1999, Australia, puppetry)
Mr. Zed Show, The (1994) IMDb
Murder and the Android (1959, film)
Mutant X (2001–2004)
My Favorite Martian (1963–1966)
My Hero (2000–2006, UK)
My Living Doll (1964–1965)
My Own Worst Enemy (2008)
My Parents Are Aliens (1999–2006, UK)
My Secret Identity (1988–1991, Canada)
My Superhero (2010) IMDb
Mysterious Doctor Satan (1940)Mysterious Island (franchise):
Mysterious Island, The a.k.a. La isla misteriosa y el capitán Nemo (1973, Spain, miniseries)
Mysterious Island (1995)
Mysterious Island (2005, film)
Mysterious Ways (2002–2004)
Mystery Science Theater 3000 a.k.a. MST3K (1988–1999)
MythQuest (elements of science fiction)AnimationM.A.S.K. (1985–1986, animated)Machine Robo (franchise)
Machine Robo: Revenge of Cronos (1986–1987, Japan, animated)
Machine Robo: Battle Hackers (1987, Japan, animated)
Machine Robo Rescue (2003–2004, Japan, animated)Macross (franchise):
Super Dimension Fortress Macross, The (1982–1983, Japan, animated)
Super Dimension Cavalry Southern Cross (1984, Japan, animated)
Super Dimension Century Orguss (1983–1984, Japan, animated)
Macross 7 (1994–1995, Japan, animated)
Macross Frontier (2008, Japan, animated)
Macross Delta (2016, Japan, animated)
Magician, The a.k.a. Magicien, Le (1997–1998, France, animated)
Magne Robo Gakeen (1976–1977, Japan, animated)Mahoromatic (franchise):
Mahoromatic: Automatic Maiden (2001–2002, Japan, animated)
Mahoromatic: Something More Beautiful (2002–2003, Japan, animated)
Manta and Moray (1979, animated, Tarzan and the Super 7 segment)Marine Boy a.k.a. Undersea Boy Marine (franchise):
Dolphin Prince (1966, Japan, animated)
Hang On! Marine Kid (1969, Japan, animated)
Undersea Boy Marine (1969–1971, Japan, animated)Mario (franchise):
Saturday Supercade: Space Ace (1984, segment, animated)
Super Mario Bros. Super Show!, The (1989, animated)
Captain N: The Game Master (1989–1991, animated)
Adventures of Super Mario Bros. 3, The (1990, animated)
Super Mario World (1991, animated)
Mars Daybreak (2004, Japan, animated)
Martin Mystery (2003–2006, Italy/France/Canada, animated) (elements of science fiction)
Mary Shelley's Frankenhole (2010–2012, animated) (elements of science fiction)Max Steel (franchise):
Max Steel (2013–2016, animated)
Max Steel (2000–2002, animated)Mazinger (franchise):
Mazinger Z (1972–1974, Japan, animated) a.k.a. Tranzor Z (US)
Great Mazinger (1974–1975, Japan, animated)
Grendizer (1975–1977, Japan, animated)
God Mazinger (1984, Japan, animated)
Shin Mazinger Shougeki! Z Hen (2009, Japan, animated)
Mechander Robo (1977, Japan, animated)
Medabots a.k.a. Medarot (1999–2001, Japan, animated)Mega Man (US) a.k.a. Rockman (Japan) (franchise):
Mega Man a.k.a. Mega Man: A Rockman series (1994–1995, Japan/US, animated)
MegaMan NT Warrior a.k.a. Mega Man Battle Network a.k.a. Rockman.EXE (2002–2003, Japan, animated)
MegaMan NT Warrior Axess a.k.a. Rockman.EXE Axess (2003–2004, Japan, animated)
MegaMan NT Warrior Stream a.k.a. Rockman.EXE Stream (2004–2005, Japan, animated)
MegaMan NT Warrior Beast a.k.a. Rockman.EXE Beast (2005–2006, Japan, animated)
MegaMan NT Warrior Beast+ a.k.a. Rockman.EXE Beast+ (2006, Japan, animated)
Mega Man Star Force a.k.a. Shooting Star Rockman (2006–2007, Japan, animated)
Mega Man Star Force Tribe a.k.a. Shooting Star Rockman Tribe (2007–2008, Japan, animated)
Megas XLR (2004–2005, animated)
Men in Black: The Series a.k.a. Men in Black: The Animated Series a.k.a. MIB: The Series (1997–2001, animated)
MetaJets (2008–2010, South Korea/Canada, animated)
Metal Armor Dragonar (1987–1988, Japan, animated)
Metal Fighter Miku (1994, Japan, animated)
Mighty Ducks (1996–1997, animated)
Mighty Heroes, The (1966, animated)
Mighty Max (1993–1994, animated)Mighty Mouse (franchise):
New Adventures of Mighty Mouse and Heckle & Jeckle, The (1979–1982, animated)
Mighty Mouse: The New Adventures (1987–1988, animated)
Miles from Tomorrowland (2015, animated)
Mirai Robo Daltanious (1979–1980, Japan, animated)
Monster Force (1994, animated) (elements of science fiction)Monsters vs. Aliens''' (franchise):B.O.B.'s Big Break (2009, Monsters vs. Aliens spin-off, short film, animated)Monsters vs. Aliens: Mutant Pumpkins from Outer Space (2009, Monsters vs. Aliens spin-off, special, animated)Night of the Living Carrots (2011, Monsters vs. Aliens spin-off, Monsters vs. Aliens: Mutant Pumpkins from Outer Space sequel, special, animated)Monsters vs. Aliens a.k.a. MvA (2013–2014, Monsters vs. Aliens spin-off, animated)Moonlight Mask (1958–1959, Japan)Seigi wo Ai Suru Mono – Gekko- Kamen a.k.a. The One Who Loves Justice: Moonlight Mask (1972, Japan, animated)We Know You, Moonlight Mask-kun! (1999–2000, Japan, animated)Moonlight Mile (2007, Japan, animated)Mortal Kombat: Defenders of the Realm (1996, animated)Motorcity (2012, animated)Muteking, The Dashing Warrior (1980–1981, Japan, animated)My Favorite Martians (1973–1975, animated)My Goldfish Is Evil (2006–2008, Canada, animated)My Life as a Teenage Robot (2003–2009, animated)Mysterious Cities of Gold, The'' (1982–1983, animated)

References

Television programs, M